Bartell is an English surname and given name. It may refer to:


Companies
Bartell Drugs, an American retail pharmacy chain
Bartell Group, a former American broadcasting company
Bartell (guitars), a maker of electric guitars and basses, from 1964 to 1969

People

Given name
Bartell LaRue (1932–1990), American voice actor

Surname
Dick Bartell (1907–1995), American baseball player
Floyd Bartell (1883-1961), American chemistry professor
Harry Bartell (1913–2004), American actor and announcer
Jason Bartell, an American musician who records under the name Mythless
Lawrence Bartell (1923–2017), American chemistry professor
Michael Bartell, Socialist Workers candidate in the 1950 New York state election
Phillip J. Bartell (born 1970), American filmmaker
Ron Bartell (born 1982), American football player
Seth Bartell, a victim of the Rocori High School shooting

Other uses
Bartell (album), a 2005 compilation album by The Moog Cookbook
Bartell D'Arcy, a fictional character in "The Dead", a James Joyce short story
Bartell mechanism, an intramolecular movement

See also
Bartel (disambiguation)